Staines railway station is on the Waterloo to Reading line and is the junction station for the diverging Windsor line, in southern England to the west of London.

History 
From the outset, the line was leased to, and operated by, the LSWR, who purchased it outright in 1878. From Wokingham, LSWR trains continued to  using running powers over the South Eastern Railway (SER).

In the grouping of railways in 1923, the LSWR and SER became part of the Southern Railway. In 1930 the Windsor line was electrified on the third rail system at a nominal 660 volts DC.

The Southern Railway was nationalised along with the rest of the railway network in 1948 and incorporated into British Railways. Following the privatisation of British Rail in the 1990s, the operation of Staines station and the trains serving it were transferred to the South West Trains train operating company, owned by the Stagecoach Group, whilst ownership and management of the track and infrastructure passed to Railtrack  and, subsequently, Network Rail.

A refurbishment of the station was completed in November 2008 with ticket barriers on the platforms and a renovated ticket office. Wheelchair access to the platforms was provided by a new footbridge with lifts.

Setting and previous name 
The station serves the town of Staines-upon-Thames in Surrey in southern England to the west of London and is a pre-junction/junction station for the diverging Windsor line. The Windsor Line, a branch of the longer route to Reading laid out as the original destination for the lines from London via Staines, is due to quirk of naming conventions in the rail sector, rarely referred to as a branch line. Both lines are traditionally referred to as "the Windsor Lines" and the passenger lobby group influencing the service pattern of the lines is named the Windsor Lines Passenger Group.

To distinguish it from the others during their existence the station was known as Staines Central, Staines Junction and Staines Old.

Operation

Layout 
Staines railway station is a conventional (double-track) railway, immediately east of the junction of the Windsor and Reading lines, having converged. It has two flanking platforms, with the main station entrance and buildings on the northern platform 1, and a secondary entrance and buildings on the southern platform 2.

The two platforms are linked by two footbridges, one at each end of the station. The older western bridge is accessed by stairs. The newer eastern bridge has stairs and lifts to make it wheelchair accessible. There are toilets on Platform 2.

The station also has a small siding east to the station.

Services  
Staines railway station is served by South Western Railway services from London Waterloo to Windsor, Reading and Weybridge. Off-peak, each of these services operates two trains per hour, combining to provide six trains per hour from Staines to Waterloo (four are limited stop via Richmond, the other two are all stations via ).

On Sundays, there is an hourly stopping service on the line via Brentford - this runs to/from  rather than Weybridge.  The Reading & Windsor lines still run half-hourly.

Trains to Waterloo stop at platform 1 and trains from Waterloo stop at platform 2.

Connections 
The two are linked by a walking route that first parallels the Windsor line to the north-west, before passing under the line near the site of the former Staines High Street station.

Steam Train Excursions 
Steam trains often visit the station for summer visits to the West Country and Bath.

Bus Connections

The 950 Thorpe Park Express bus link runs between the front of the station and the nearby Thorpe Park theme park.

London Buses route 117 and 290 have stops 50m north of the station. Other buses operate from the bus station accessed via a broad archway and surface car park from the path to the town centre.

Accidents and incidents
On 9 August 1957, a light engine (a 700 class 0-6-0) was being moved from the up loop across the up main to the down main, and the signals were correctly set for this movement – amongst other things, this meant that the starting signal for the up platform was at danger. Despite this, an electric train bound for Waterloo set off from the platform, travelled  and collided almost head-on with the light engine, which overturned injuring both of its crew – the driver's leg was broken. The leading coach of the electric train was severely damaged; the motorman and twelve of the seventy passengers sustained minor injuries.

Future plans

Additional route and track proposals

Since 2000, a number of transport proposals have been put forward to improve rail connections with Heathrow Airport. The Heathrow Airtrack scheme, proposed in 2000 by BAA, envisaged the creation of a direct rail service from Heathrow Airport via Staines to Waterloo. A new station was also planned close to the site of the former Staines High Street railway station. The new link would also have enabled the existing Heathrow Express service to be extended from Heathrow to terminate at Staines. Heathrow Airtrack was abandoned in 2011 due to forecast problems with the large number of level crossings on the route into London.

A further scheme for new rail links to Heathrow via Staines is currently at the proposal stage. The Heathrow Southern Railway was put forward by a business consortium to create links west of Heathrow Airport with the Waterloo–Reading line, the Great Western Main Line and the Hounslow Loop Line, including a link to Staines.

Notes and references
References

Notes

External links
 

Railway stations in Surrey
DfT Category C2 stations
Former London and South Western Railway stations
Railway stations in Great Britain opened in 1848
Railway stations served by South Western Railway
Staines-upon-Thames